In accounting, finance, and economics, a risk-seeker or risk-lover is a person who has a preference for risk.

While most investors are considered risk averse, one could view casino-goers as risk-seeking. A common example to explain risk-seeking behaviour is; If offered two choices; either $50 as a sure thing, or a 50%  chance each of either $100 or nothing, a risk-seeking person would prefer the gamble. Even though the gamble and the "sure thing" have the same expected value, the preference for risk makes the gamble's expected utility for the individual much higher.

The Utility Function and Risk-Seekers 
Choice under uncertainty is when a person facing a choice is not certain of the possible outcomes or their probability of occurring. The standard way to model how people choose under uncertain condition, is by using expected utility. In order to calculate expected utility, a utility function 'u' is developed in order to translate money into Utility. Therefore, if a person has '' money, their utility would be . This is explored further when investigating potential "prospects". A prospect, in this context, is a list of expected payoffs and their probabilities of occurring. A prospect is summarised using the form;

The overall expected value of the prospect (A) is subsequently expressed as;

The expected utility, U(A), of the prospect is then determined using the below formula;

The utility function is convex for a risk-lover and concave for a risk-averse person (and subsequently linear for a risk-neutral person). Subsequently, it can be understood that the utility function curves in this way depending on the individual's personal preference towards risk.

Below is an example of a convex utility function, with wealth, '' along the x-axis and utility, '' along the y-axis. The below graph shows how greater payoffs result in larger utility values at an increasing rate. Showing that the person with this utility function is "risk-loving".Alternatively, below is an example of a concave utility function, with wealth, '' along the x-axis and utility, '' along the y-axis. The below graph again display's an individual's utility function, however this time lower payoffs have a larger utility with respect to the original payoff (or "wealth") value. The utility values, although still increasing, do so as a decreasing rate. Showing that this person is "risk-averse".

Psychology

Child personality traits' effect on adulthood – What traits contribute to risk-seeking?
In a study done by Friedman et al. (1995), they found significant evidence to support that low childhood conscientiousness contributed heavily to adulthood mortality. Those who were high in conscientiousness as a child were 30% less likely to die in their adulthood. Ultimately, their findings solidified that low levels of childhood conscientiousness predict risk seeking, and risk-seeking increases the chance of accidental death. Though risk-seeking deteriorates with age, risky exposure to abusive substances in adolescence can lead to lifetime risk factors due to addiction. Conscientious individuals are subject to greater internal impulse control which lets them think out risky decisions more carefully, while those low on conscientiousness are more likely to endanger themselves and others by risky, or sometimes even criminal behaviour.

Psychometric paradigm
The psychometric paradigm explores what stable personality traits and risk behaviours have in common with an individualistic approach. Zuckerman's (1994) sensation seeking theory is important in assessing the causative factors of certain risk-seeking behaviours. Many risk-seeking behaviours justify humans need for sensation seeking. Behaviours like adventurous sports, drug use, promiscuous sex, entrepreneurship, gambling, and dangerous driving to name a few both represent sensation seeking, as well as risk seeking.  Impulsivity has been linked to risk-seeking and can be described as the desire to indulge in situations with a potential reward, and little to no planning of the potential punishments of loss or reward. Impulsivity has also been linked to sensation seeking and in recent theories have been combined to form a higher order trait called impulsive sensation seeking.

Neuropsychological paradigm
The neuropsychological paradigm looks at why people make the decisions they do, as well as the neuropsychological processes that contribute to the decisions people make. This view looks less at impulsivity, puts more emphasis on cognitive dynamics and assumes people take risks because they have assessed the future outcomes.

Men vs. women seeking risks

Demographic differences also play a role in risk-seeking between individuals. Through an analysis done by scientists, they demonstrated that men typically seek risks more than women. There are biological differences in men and women that may lead to the drive to seek risks. For example, testosterone plays a large role in risk-seeking in people and women have significantly lower levels of this hormone. This hormone has behavioural effects on aggression, mood and sexual function, all of which can lead to risk-seeking decision making. In their study, they also found that testosterone in excess leads to increased sexual enjoyment, and therefore more of an incentive to engage in risky unprotected sex.

References 

Financial economics
Prospect theory
Financial risk
Utility
Personality